Megacorma obliqua, the black-belted hawkmoth, is a moth of the family Sphingidae.

Distribution 
It is known from Sri Lanka, north-eastern India, Myanmar, south-western China (Yunnan, Hainan), Thailand, northern Vietnam, Malaysia (Peninsular, Sarawak, Sabah), Indonesia (Sumatra, Kalimantan, Java, Ceram, Papua Barat), the Philippines (including Palawan), Papua New Guinea and the Solomon Islands.

Description 
The wingspan is 120–145 mm. It can be distinguished from all other Sphingidae species by the combination of the labial palp structure, long thorax and wing pattern.

References

Acherontiini
Moths described in 1856
Moths of Borneo